Los Moonlights is a rock band from Montevideo, Uruguay. Their debut album, Moonlights, was their greatest commercial success.
Formed in the 1960s, Los Moonlights disbanded in 1977. They reunited in 2015.

History 
Formed at the end the 1960s and fronted by the Iriarte brothers, Los Moonlights began by playing live covers. With the arrival of longtime members Gastón "Dino" Ciarlo and Yamandu Pérez, they began writing original material.

After recording a few singles for the Clave label, Los Moonlights signed with De La Planta. They recorded their debut album, which contains songs such as "Vamos dulce muchacha" and "Milonga de pelo largo". They mainly played shows in small local establishments.

With the 1973 Uruguayan coup d'état, the military dictatorship made it difficult for many rock bands to survive. Los Moonlights kept playing live as long as possible.

In 1976, they released their second album, Moonlight Hoy. However, the album was a commercial failure and the band dissolved in 1977.

In 2015, Los Moonlights reunited and launched a national tour to promote their new album, titled Otro día en la ciudad.

Band members
Current members
 Sergio Iriarte – guitar, vocals
 Osvaldo Iriarte – bass, vocals
 Carlitos González Iriarte
 Sergio González Iriarte
 JuanjoGonzález Iriarte
 Ricky Añón

Past members
 Gastón "Dino" Ciarlo – rhythm guitar, vocals
 Cásar Jover – guitar
 Yamandú Pérez – drums
 Quico Ciccone – drums

Discography
 Moonlights (1972)
 Moonlight Hoy (1976)
 Otro día en la ciudad

References

Uruguayan rock music groups